Caprinia is a genus of moths of the family Crambidae.

Species
Caprinia castanealis Kenrick, 1907
Caprinia conglobatalis (Walker, 1865)
Caprinia cuprescens Hampson, 1912
Caprinia felderi Lederer, 1863
Caprinia fimbriata (E. Hering, 1903)
Caprinia intermedia Warren, 1896
Caprinia marginata Janse, 1924
Caprinia periusalis Walker, 1859
Caprinia trichotarsia Hampson, 1912
Caprinia unicoloralis (Kenrick, 1907)
Caprinia versicolor (Pagenstecher, 1900)

References

Spilomelinae
Crambidae genera
Taxa named by Francis Walker (entomologist)